EDANS (5-((2-Aminoethyl)amino)naphthalene-1-sulfonic acid) is a donor for FRET-based nucleic acid probes and protease substrates. EDANS is often paired with DABCYL or DABSYL. The combination can be used in enzyme assays. When the two compounds are in close proximity, most of the energy emitted from EDANS will be quenched by DABCYL. However, if the compounds are separated (for example, by substrate cleavage) EDANS will fluoresce, giving an indication of enzyme presence.

See also
 Dark quencher

References

Fluorescent dyes